The West Coast Eagles have drafted players through the Australian Football League's draft system, beginning with the 1988 VFL Draft. The West Coast Eagles have participated in every National Draft since then, and also participated in the Pre-season Draft (first held in 1989), the Mid-season Draft (held from 1990–1993), and the Rookie Draft (first held in 1997). So far, the West Coast Eagles have drafted over 200 players through the draft system, with another 30 or so being recruited via the VFL's old zone recruitment system prior to 1993.

1987 pre-season

1988 pre-season

Recruitment
1: Murray Rance
2: Kevin Caton
3: Joe Cormack
4: Shane Ellis
5: Richard Geary
6: Peter Higgins
7: Brent Hutton
8: Don Langsford
9: Troy Ugle
10: Clinton Browning
11: Guy McKenna

1989 pre-season

Pre-draft selections
1: Stevan Jackson
2: Don Pyke
3: Peter Sumich
4: Craig Turley
5: Scott Watters

1988 National draft
2: Todd Breman
10: Peter Higgins (re-drafted)
24: David Hynes
38: Jeremy Crough
44: Scott Williamson
52: Darren Bartsch
66: Matt Richardson
80: Damian Berto
94: Andrew Geddes
108: Peter Melesso

1989 pre-season draft
10: Shane Cable
24: Clinton Browning
38: Shane Ellis
52: Richard Geary

1990 pre-season

Pre-draft selections
1: Ryan Turnbull
2: Peter Mann

1989 National draft
4: Peter Matera
50: Tony Evans
78: Stephen Schwerdt
92: Brett Heady
112: Ashley McIntosh (F/S)
Addit. selection: Dean Kemp
Addit. selection: Tony Begovich
Addit. selection: Brad Gwilliam

1990 pre-season draft
4: Craig McGrath
10: Phil Narkle
24: Warren Dean
38: Bret Hutchinson

1990 mid-season draft
10: Craig McNaughton

1991 pre-season

Pre-draft selections
1: Mitchell White
2: Glen Jakovich

1990 National draft
9: Matt Clape
12: Shane Porter
20: Robbie West
36: Matthew Burton
64: Derek Hall
69: Gavan Cooney
83: Mark Williams

1991 pre-season draft
18: Cory Young
35: Craig McNaughton (re-drafted)
49: Brad Edwards
57: Peter Higgins (re-drafted)

1992 pre-season

Pre-draft selections
1: Jason Ball

1991 National draft
16: Daniel Metropolis
24: Kane Morphett
25: Steven Davies
29: Matthew Connell
42: Peter Freeman
74: Brendan Krummel

1992 pre-season draft
13: Tim Watson
27: David Ogg
41: Jason Disney

1992 mid-season draft
13: Damian Hampson

1993 pre-season

1992 National draft
1: Drew Banfield
8: Paul Symmons
19: Lee Walker
21: Shane Bond
34: Travis Burton
49: Jarrad Schofield
64: Tony Godden
79: Brett Spinks
94: Rhys Croxford
109: David Muir
124: Brayden Lyle

1993 pre-season draft
19: Brendon Retzlaff
35: Travis Edmonds
49: Brendan Green

1994 pre-season

1993 National draft
16: Fraser Gehrig
33: Ben Robbins
43: Jason Heatley

1994 pre-season draft
17: Scott Thomson

1995 pre-season

1994 National draft
12: Shane Sikora
37: Ashley Blurton
44: Jeremy Dyer
54: Ian Downsborough
55: Chad Morrison (compensation pick)
71: Jason Spinks

1995 pre-season draft
17: Paul Peos

1996 pre-season

1995 National draft
3: Brendon Fewster
14: Luke Trew
30: Craig Smoker
44: Jonson Clifton
57: Paul Whitelaw
66: Neil Marshall
F/S: Ben Cousins

1996 pre-season draft
13: Andrew Donnelly

Pre-draft compensation selection
David Wirrpanda

1997 pre-season

1996 National draft
1: Michael Gardiner
24: Josh Wooden
39: Nick Stone
53: Michael Braun
57: Trent Cummings

1997 Rookie draft
12: Paul Blair
28: Todd Nener
44: Trent Simpson
60: Mark Webb

1998 pre-season

1997 National draft
12: Jaxon Crabb
13: Callum Chambers
28: Rowan Jones
34: Andrew Williams
37: Todd Holmes
44: David Antonowicz
60: Phil Read

1998 Rookie draft
11: Conrad Chambers
26: Chad Fletcher
43: Laurie Bellotti
59: Heath Younie
75: Todd Nener (re-drafted)
91: Trent Simpson (re-drafted)

1999 pre-season

1998 National draft
10: Brandon Hill
26: Michael O'Brien
57: Andrew Embley
69: Scott Bennett
89: Joel Duckworth

1999 Rookie draft
12: Simon Duckworth
28: Mark Pearson
44: Andrew Taylor

2000 pre-season

1999 National draft
11: Darren Glass
14: Travis Gaspar
16: David Haynes
29: Adam Hunter
41: Kane Munro

2000 Rookie draft
12: Toby McGrath
28: Dean Cox
44: Kasey Green

2001 pre-season

2000 National draft
5: Andrew McDougall
18: Daniel Kerr
36: Jeremy Humm
45: Trent Carroll

2001 Pre-season draft
3: Troy Wilson

2001 Rookie draft
4: Dean Buszan
20: Zach Beeck
35: Andrew McCarrey
48: Kris Miller

2002 pre-season

2001 National draft
3: Chris Judd(Priority selection)
6: Ashley Sampi
22: Mark Seaby
38: Ashley Hansen

2002 Rookie draft
3: Brent Tuckey
19: Quinten Lynch
34: Clancy Rudeforth

2003 pre-season

2002 National draft
24: Paul Johnson
37: Brent Staker
53: Adam Selwood

2003 Rookie draft
9: Aaron Edwards
25: Mark Nicoski
41: Zach Beeck (re-drafted)

2004 pre-season

2003 National draft
11: Beau Waters
20: Sam Butler
26: Daniel McConnell

2004 Rookie draft
9: Brett Jones
25: Michael Embley
40: Jaymie Graham
54: Clancy Rudeforth (re-drafted)

2005 pre-season

2004 National draft
29: Matthew Rosa
37: Mark LeCras
44: Mitch Morton (F/S)
57: Brad Smith

2005 Rookie draft
9: Benjamin Sharp
25: Beau Wilkes
40: Ashley Thornton
52: Aaron Edwards (re-drafted)

2006 pre-season

2005 National draft
13: Shannon Hurn
29: Ben McKinley
34: Matt Spangher

2006 Rookie draft
15: Steven Armstrong
31: Matthew Priddis
44: Michael Embley (re-drafted)

2007 pre-season

2006 National draft
16: Mitch Brown
29: Eric Mackenzie
43: Tim Houlihan
50: Will Schofield
80: James Thomson

2007 Rookie draft
16: Jamie McNamara
31: Llane Spaanderman
45: Chad Jones
56: Ben Sharp (re-drafted)
60: Ashley Thornton (re-drafted)
65: Beau Wilkes (re-drafted)

2008 pre-season

2007 National draft
3: Chris Masten
13: Brad Ebert
20: Tony Notte
22: Scott Selwood

2008 Pre-season draft
7: Patrick McGinnity

2008 Rookie draft
12: Lewis Stevenson
28: Ashley Arrowsmith
43: Will Sullivan
55: Callum Wilson
59: Beau Wilkes (re-drafted)
28: Ryan Davis (NSW Scholarship)

2009 pre-season

2008 National draft
2: Nic Naitanui
18: Luke Shuey (Priority selection)
20: Tom Swift
36: Ashley Smith
52: Jordan Jones

2009 Rookie draft
2: Liam Bedford
18: Adam Cockie

2010 pre-season

2009 National draft
7: Brad Sheppard
22: Gerrick Weedon
23: Koby Stevens

2010 Pre-season draft
5: Ryan Neates

2010 Rookie draft
11: Lewis Broome
27: Andrew Strijk
40: Ashton Hams
53: Jarrad Oakley-Nicholls

2011 pre-season

2010 National draft
4: Andrew Gaff
26: Jack Darling
28: Scott Lycett
62: Jacob Brennan (F/S)

2011 Pre-season draft
2: Blayne Wilson

2011 Rookie draft
10: Tim Houlihan (re-drafted)
27: Anton Hamp
44: Jeremy McGovern

2012 pre-season

2011 National Draft
23: Murray Newman
28: Fraser McInnes
63: Ashton Hams (rookie elevation)

List of players who were traded to the club

1989
1: Peter Wilson traded by Richmond for draft selections 18 and 32

1990

1991
3: Trent Nichols  traded for draft selection 51

1994

1995

1996

1997

2000

2002

2004

2007

2009

2011

2012

2013
1: Elliot Yeo traded by for draft selection 28

See also
List of West Coast Eagles players

Notes

References
 
 http://www.footywire.com/afl/footy/td-west-coast-eagles
 http://afltables.com/afl/stats/alltime/westcoast.html

Draft
West Coast Eagles